Arusha City F.C. is a Tanzanian football club from Arusha. Its home games are played at Sheikh Amri Abeid Memorial Stadium.  The team played in the Tanzanian Premier League in 2007, but was relegated at the end of the season to the second level and played in the Tanzanian Second Division League, the third tier.

Arusha FC returned to the Tanzanian Premier League for the 2010/11 season.

References

Football clubs in Tanzania
Sport in Arusha